Wiangaree is a town in northern New South Wales, Australia. Part of the Northern Rivers region, the town is on the Richmond River. It is administratively part of Kyogle Council.

John Gleeson (Australian Test Cricketer) was born in Wiangaree.

References

Towns in New South Wales
Kyogle Council